Passa may refer to:

People
 Chiara Passa (born 1973), Italian visual artist
 Frank Passa (1916–2001), American luthier
 François Jaubert de Passa (1785-1856), French engineer and politician

Places
 Passa, Pyrénées-Orientales, France
 Pässä, Võru County, Estonia
 Passa Cinco River, São Paulo, Brazil
 Passa Dois River, Paraná, Brazil
 Passa Quatro, Minas Gerais, Brazil
 Passa Sete, Rio Grande do Sul, Brazil
 Passa Tempo, Minas Gerais, Brazil
 Passa Três River, Paraná, Brazil
 Passa Una River, Paraná, Brazil
 Passa e Fica, Rio Grande do Norte, Brazil
 Passa-Vinte, Minas Gerais, Brazil

Other
 Passa, moth also known as gastrina
 Passa Passa, Jamaican weekly street party